The following is a list of awards, honors, and nominations received by American singer-songwriter, memoirist, and children's author Carly Simon. Among her numerous accolades, she is the recipient of two Grammy Awards, from 14 nominations, as well as an Academy Award and a Golden Globe Award. Her debut album, Carly Simon, was released in 1971 and won her the Grammy Award for Best New Artist in 1972, while the lead single "That's the Way I've Always Heard It Should Be" earned her a nomination for Best Female Pop Vocal Performance at the same ceremony. Her second album, Anticipation, earned her another Grammy nomination in the same category the following year. Her third album, No Secrets, was released in 1972 and spawned the worldwide hit "You're So Vain", which earned Simon three Grammy nominations in 1974: Record of the Year, Song of the Year, and Best Female Pop Vocal Performance. No Secrets also earned a nomination for Best Engineered Recording at the same ceremony, for engineers Robin Geoffrey Cable and Bill Schnee.

Simon's 1977 worldwide hit "Nobody Does It Better", the theme song to the Bond film The Spy Who Loved Me, garnered her another Grammy nomination for Best Female Pop Vocal Performance in 1978. The song also earned a nomination for Song of the Year, for composer Marvin Hamlisch and songwriter Carole Bayer Sager. Simon's seventh album, Boys in the Trees, was released later that year and spawned the hit single "You Belong to Me", which earned Simon another Grammy nomination for Best Female Pop Vocal Performance in 1979. Boys in the Trees won Best Album Package at the same ceremony; the Grammy went to Johnny Lee and Tony Lane. Simon's eighth album, Spy, was released in 1979 and its lead single, "Vengeance", earned Simon a Grammy nomination for Best Female Rock Vocal Performance in 1980, the first year to feature this category.

Simon released her 13th album, Coming Around Again, in 1987. It became a major hit and earned her two Grammy nominations: Best Recording for Children for "Itsy Bitsy Spider" in 1987, and Best Female Pop Vocal Performance for the album in 1988. With her 1988 hit "Let the River Run", from the film Working Girl, Simon became the first artist to win a Grammy, an Academy Award, and a Golden Globe for a song composed and written, as well as performed, entirely by a single artist. For her musical work on the films Working Girl and Postcards from the Edge, Simon earned two consecutive British Academy Film Awards nominations for Best Film Music, in 1990 and 1991, respectively. Simon was inducted into the Songwriters Hall of Fame in 1994. In 1995 and 1998, respectively, she received the Boston Music Awards Lifetime Achievement and a Berklee College of Music Honorary Doctor of Music Degree. Two more Grammy nominations followed, the first for Film Noir in 1998 and the second for Moonlight Serenade in 2006, both in the category of Best Traditional Pop Vocal Album.

Simon was inducted into the Grammy Hall of Fame for "You're So Vain" in 2004, and was nominated for a star on the Hollywood Walk of Fame the following year, but she has yet to claim her star. She was awarded the Founders Award from the American Society of Composers, Authors and Publishers (ASCAP) in 2012. Simon was set to be honored at Carnegie Hall with a tribute concert on March 19, 2020, but it was postponed due to the COVID-19 pandemic. It was rescheduled to take place on March 23, 2022, but was later canceled altogether due to COVID-19–related challenges. On November 5, 2022, Simon was inducted into the Rock and Roll Hall of Fame. She was unable to attend the ceremony due to a personal tragedy. She was inducted by American singer-songwriter Sara Bareilles.

Major industry awards

Academy Awards
The Academy Awards, established in 1929 and organized by the Academy of Motion Picture Arts and Sciences, are a set of awards given annually for excellence of cinematic achievements. Simon has received one award, from one nomination.

"Nobody Does It Better" was nominated for the Academy Award for Best Original Song in 1978. This nomination is credited to composer Marvin Hamlisch and songwriter Carole Bayer Sager.

British Academy Film Awards
The British Academy Film Awards (BAFTA) are presented in an annual award show hosted by the British Academy of Film and Television Arts to honor the best British and international contributions to film. Simon has received two nominations.

Golden Globe Awards
The Golden Globe Awards are presented annually by the Hollywood Foreign Press Association to recognize outstanding achievements in film and television, both domestic and foreign. Simon has received one award, from one nomination.

"Nobody Does It Better" was nominated for the Golden Globe Award for Best Original Song in 1978. This nomination is credited to composer Marvin Hamlisch and songwriter Carole Bayer Sager.

Grammy Awards
The Grammy Awards are awarded annually by The Recording Academy of the United States for outstanding achievements in the music industry. Often considered the highest music honor, the awards were established in 1958. Simon has won two awards, from 14 nominations, and received one honorary award.

The following list represents Grammy Award nominations and wins connected to Simon's work, as well as work to which Simon contributed.
 

Notes
  The photographer was Norman Seeff.
  The photo featured on the front cover of the album was expertly airbrushed to paint a Danskin top on what was a topless photo of Simon.
  Simon was one of the various artists featured on each album.
  Simon was one of the various artists featured on the album. She duets with Sinatra on the track "Guess I'll Hang My Tears Out to Dry/In the Wee Small Hours of the Morning".
  Simon provides featured vocals on the tracks "Clouds" (Interlude) and "Son of a Gun (I Betcha Think This Song Is About You)".

Other industry awards

ASCAP Awards
The Founders Award is presented by the American Society of Composers, Authors and Publishers. The prestigious honor is given to songwriters and composers who have made pioneering contributions to music by inspiring and influencing their fellow music creators. Simon was honored with the award in 2012.

Boston Music Awards
The Boston Music Awards are a set of music awards given annually that showcase talent in the Boston, Massachusetts area. Founded in 1987, Simon has received eight nominations, and won three awards, as well as one honorary award.

CableACE Awards
The CableACE Awards, earlier known as the ACE Awards, is a defunct award that was given by what was then the National Cable Television Association from 1978 to 1997 to honor excellence in American cable television programming. Simon received three nominations and one win.

Hollywood Walk of Fame
The Hollywood Walk of Fame is a sidewalk along Hollywood Boulevard and Vine Street in Hollywood, California, with more than 2,000 five-pointed stars to honor artists for their achievement in the entertainment industry. Simon was selected for the honor in 2005, but a date was never set and she has yet to claim her star.

Online Film & Television Association
The Online Film & Television Association is an organization based online in the United States and Canada. The awards were established in 1996 and are split into two branches, film and television. Simon has received one nomination.

Rock and Roll Hall of Fame
The Rock and Roll Hall of Fame, established on April 20, 1983, by Ahmet Ertegun, is museum and hall of fame located in Cleveland, Ohio. The museum documents the history of rock music and the artists, producers, engineers, and other notable figures who have influenced its development. On May 4, 2022, Simon was announced as one of the seven artists in the performer category being inducted into the Rock & Roll Hall of Fame Class of 2022. The ceremony took place on November 5, 2022.

Songwriters Hall of Fame
The Songwriters Hall of Fame is an American institution founded in 1969 to honor those whose work represents and maintains the heritage and legacy of a spectrum of the most beloved English language songs from the world's popular music songbook. Simon was inducted in 1994.

Other honors and recognitions 
 1991 – Playing Possum ranked No. 20 on Rolling Stone's 100 Greatest Album Covers of All-Time list.
 1998 – Received the Berklee College of Music Honorary Doctor of Music Degree.
 1999 – Ranked No. 28 on VH1's 100 Greatest Women in Rock & Roll.
 2004 – AFI's 100 Years...100 Songs. "Nobody Does It Better" ranked at No. 67, and "Let the River Run" ranked at No. 91.
 2008 – Billboard Hot 100 50th Anniversary Charts: The All-Time Top 100 Songs. "You're So Vain" ranked at No. 72.
 2012 – "Nobody Does It Better" ranked No. 3 on Rolling Stone's list, and No. 2 on Billboard's list, of the Top 10 James Bond Theme Songs.
 2013 – Billboard Hot 100 55th Anniversary Charts: The All-Time Top 100 Songs. "You're So Vain" ranked at No. 82.
 2014 – UK Official Charts Company crowned "You're So Vain" the ultimate song of the 1970s.
 2015 – "Why" ranked No. 188 on Pitchfork's list of the 200 Best Songs of the 1980s.
 2021 – USA Today crowned "Nobody Does it Better" the greatest James Bond Theme Song.
 2021 – "You're So Vain" ranked No. 495 on Rolling Stone's 500 Greatest Songs of All Time.

See also
Carly Simon discography

References

External links
Carly Simon's Official Website

Simon, Carly
Awards